She is the second studio album by the band Stiltskin now led by Ray Wilson. The project is sometimes known as Ray Wilson & Stiltskin. The music is a fusion of diverse influences including Daft Punk, Phil Lynott, Audioslave, Metallica, David Bowie and Radiohead.

Earlier releases of the album were released in early spring 2006 with free digital downloads of album cuts "Lemon Yellow Sun" and the title track. The album was commercially released in October 2006 in Eastern Europe with plans to release the album in the UK in 2007.

Track listing
"Fly High" (Uwe Metzler, Ray Wilson) - 5:08
"Taking Time" (Scott Spence, Wilson) - 6:13
"She" (Spence, Wilson) - 4:23
"Lemon Yellow Sun" (Metzler, Wilson) - 4:06
"Wake Up Your Mind" (Metzler, Adonis Star, Wilson) - 4:05
"Sick and Tired" (Metzler, Star, Wilson) - 3:40
"Constantly Reminded" (Metzler, Wilson) - 5:17
"Show Me the Way" (Wilson) - 4:27
"Fame" (Metzler, Wilson) - 3:45
"Some of All My Fears" (Metzler, Wilson) - 4:20
"Summer Days" (Metzler, Spence, Wilson) - 4:49
"Better Luck Next Time" (Metzler, Wilson) - 5:08

Personnel
Stiltskin
 Ray Wilson  - lead vocals, acoustic guitars, bass (track 10)
 Irvin Duguid - keyboards
 Uwe Metzler - lead/acoustic guitars
 Alvin Mills - bass
 Henrik Muller - drums (tracks 5 & 10)
 Scott Spence - lead guitars (tracks 2 & 11), acoustic guitars
 Nir Zidkyahu - drums

Additional personnel
 Peter Hoff - production & engineering

Singles
She
She (Radio Edit)
She (Bentztown Mixdown)
She (Album Version)
Wake Up Your Mind (Album Version)

Lemon Yellow Sun
Lemon Yellow Sun (Radio Edit)
Lemon Yellow Sun (Lite Radio Edit)
Lemon Yellow Sun (Album Version)
Keep On Believing (Non-Album track)

References

2006 albums
Stiltskin albums
Inside Out Music albums